Skull Lick Creek is a stream in Audrain County in the U.S. state of Missouri. It is a tributary to the South Fork of the Salt River.

Skull Lick Creek most likely was named for an incident when a party of settlers were killed by Indians who left their skulls behind.

See also
List of rivers of Missouri

References

Rivers of Audrain County, Missouri
Rivers of Missouri